Anna Delia Navarro (also cited Ana Delia Navarro; August 18, 1933 – December 27, 2006) was an American film and television actress.

Early life
With regard to Anna Navarro's birthplace, various references cite different locations. Some sources state that she was born in Nicaragua, while others note it was Winter Park, Florida. In an interview with Navarro published in the Los Angeles Times in October 1961, writer Lydia Lane identifies New York as her birthplace.

Career
Navarro began her career in entertainment serving as a guide in numerous variety television programs. According to some sources, she made her film debut in 1953’s Jack Slade. She appeared in the movies Jubilee Trail, The Human Jungle and The Adventures of Hajji Baba in 1954. Navarro’s television debut was in the western television series The Adventures of Kit Carson. She then made appearances in the television programs Treasury Men in Action, I Led 3 Lives and The Cisco Kid.

Later in her career, Navarro guest-starred in numerous television programs including Gunsmoke, Bonanza, Tales of Wells Fargo, Perry Mason, Tombstone Territory, The Virginian, The Life and Legend of Wyatt Earp, Maverick, Family Affair (3 episodes), Death Valley Days, Outlaws, Alfred Hitchcock Presents, Barnaby Jones, The Californians, Peter Gunn and Bat Masterson. Her final credit was from the action crime television series Walker, Texas Ranger.

Death
Novarro died in December 2006, at the age of 73.

Filmography 
 Jack Slade (1953) as Mexican Girl (uncredited)
 Jubilee Trail (1954) as Conchita (uncredited)
 The Human Jungle (1954) as Waitress (uncredited)
 The Adventures of Hajji Baba (1954) as Slave Girl (uncredited)
 Son of Sinbad (1955) as Slave Girl (uncredited)
 Wichita (1955) as Girl (uncredited)
 Time Table (1956) as Mexican Bar Fly (uncredited)
 From Hell to Texas (1958) as Conchita (uncredited)
 The Badlanders (1958) as Raquel (uncredited)
 Topaz (1969) as Carlotta Mendoza
 The First Deadly Sin (1980) as Sunny Jordeen
 Angel III: The Final Chapter (1988) as Gloria
 Last Action Hero (1993) as Cop in Station

References

External links 

Rotten Tomatoes profile

1933 births
2006 deaths
American film actresses
American television actresses
20th-century American actresses
20th-century American women
21st-century American women
Western (genre) television actors